Mark Taylor (born 1 December 1966 in Farnborough, Kent, England) is a sound effects mixer.

Taylor has won two Primetime Emmy Awards. The first in 2000 for his work on RKO 281, and his second in 2002 for Band of Brothers: Carentan. In 2014, Taylor and his fellow sound mixers were nominated for an Academy Award for Best Sound Mixing for the 2013 film Captain Phillips. Mark Taylor was nominated again at the 88th Academy Awards for the film The Martian. In 2020, he received his third Academy Award nomination and first win for Best Sound Mixing for the 2019 film, 1917, at the 92nd Academy Awards.

References

External links
 

1966 births
Living people
British audio engineers
Emmy Award winners
Best Sound Mixing Academy Award winners
Best Sound BAFTA Award winners